Friedrich Stählin (8 April 1874, Nördlingen, Germany – 22 June 1936, Erlangen, Germany) was a German Classical Philologist and teacher. He studied the Classical Greek language and his book, Das hellenische Thessalien was published in 1924. He also contributed to the Realencyclopädie der classischen Altertumswissenschaft.

References

German philologists
People from Nördlingen
1874 births
1936 deaths